The Gallanosa Clan originated from the town of Sta. Magdalena, province of Sorsogon, Bicol Region (Region V), Philippines.

Mr. Julian Gallanosa,  the patriarch, was married to Leoncia Fungo.  There is no evidence that the family ever held the Spanish title "Don" as claimed by some descendants.  They bore 11 children, 4 boys and 7 girls. The eldest son Ysidro Gallanosa was born on May 15, 1849. He became the first town president or mayor (known locally as the "gobernordacillo") of Sta. Magdalena ( Known as Busaingan ), Sorsogon ( Known as Ibalon ), (circa 1884-1901). Ysidro was married to Tecla Dollentas of Prieto Diaz, Sorsogon. However Mayor Gallanosa was arrested by a detachment of the 15th U.S. Infantry Regiment garrisoned at nearby Matnog under Captain Edmund Wittenmeyer, on charges of aiding and abetting members of a local band of  "Anting-Anting Society" insurgents following their defeat in a skirmish at Gati, Sorsogon on Sep. 7, 1901.  On November 7, 1901, Mayor Gallanosa was shot in the back while trying to escape the American soldiers guarding him./ref>1901 Annual Report of Congress, "Reports of Operations of the Fourth Separate Brigade"</ref>.    
 
Their only child Pedro was born January 1, 1901. Tecla Dollentas-Gallanosa remarried Florentino Hitosis, a childless widower of Irosin, Sorsogon.  They had a daughter Dominga, who died at age 5. Pedro married Corazon Figueroa Grecia  of Juban, Sorsogon,  on June 26, 1927.   They inherited properties from Pedro's stepfather Florentino  upon the latter’s death on May 26, 1939 at Irosin, which were the source of a series long-running squabbles and lawsuits among their heirs until 1998.

Pedro Gallanosa became a Board Member of Sorsogon  (circa 1951-1959) under the governorships of  Messrs. Escudero &  Juan Gallanosa Frivaldo. He died August 13, 1970. His wife Corazon was born October 5, 1905.  She became the first Lady Vice-Mayor in Irosin. They donated an unprofitable piece of swampland for a school site in 1947, now the Gallanosa National High School in San Pedro, Irosin, Sorsogon.  Portions of their properties in Kawayan, Irosin was used as elementary school and barangay office up to the present. Corazon died August 30, 1975.

Filipino families
1849 births